Moechotypa asiatica is a species of beetle in the family Cerambycidae. It was described by Pic in 1903. It is known from China, Myanmar, India, Thailand, Vietnam, and Laos.

References

asiatica
Beetles described in 1903